Frantisek Sisr (born 17 March 1993) is a Czech former professional cyclist, who rode professionally between 2012 and 2020 for the , ,  and  teams. He competed in the team pursuit event at the 2013 UCI Track Cycling World Championships, and won the Ronde van Drenthe in 2018. He now works as a directeur sportif for UCI Continental team .

Major results

2011
 2nd  Madison, UEC European Junior Track Championships
2013
 3rd  Team pursuit, UEC European Under-23 Track Championships
 8th Tour Bohemia
2015
 1st Korona Kocich Gór
 1st Points classification East Bohemia Tour
 1st  Mountains classification Tour of Fuzhou
 National Road Championships
3rd Road race
4th Under-23 time trial
 8th Overall Tour d'Azerbaïdjan
1st  Young rider classification
2016
 1st Stage 1 East Bohemia Tour
 1st  Points classification Okolo Slovenska
 2nd Overall Tour de Bretagne
1st Stage 1
 5th Overall Course de Solidarność et des Champions Olympiques
 5th GP Izola
2017
 1st  Points race, National Track Championships
 4th GP Polski
 10th Ronde van Drenthe
2018
 1st Ronde van Drenthe
 1st GP Hungary
 1st Stage 3a (TTT) Sibiu Cycling Tour
 9th Schaal Sels
 9th Veenendaal–Veenendaal Classic
2019
 1st  Road race, National Road Championships
 2nd Memoriał Romana Siemińskiego
 2nd GP Adria Mobil
 3rd Overall Dookoła Mazowsza
 3rd Memoriał Andrzeja Trochanowskiego

References

External links

1993 births
Living people
Czech track cyclists
Czech male cyclists
People from Vysoké Mýto
European Games competitors for the Czech Republic
Cyclists at the 2019 European Games
Sportspeople from the Pardubice Region